81 Cancri (Pi1 Cancri, π1 Cancri) is a stellar system that lies approximately 66 light-years away. The main component of the system is a close binary, while a brown dwarf binary is located at a wide separation.

Components 
81 Cancri has long been known to be a binary, both visually and spectroscopically (VBO=SB2O). Their orbit is an eccentric 2.7 year one, resolved by over 100 milli-arcseconds due to a modest separation and close distance. The two components have similar masses and temperatures, with the secondary being only  lower in mass and a few hundred kelvin cooler.

A brown dwarf component in the system was detected in 2001. The source 2MASSW J0912145+145940 (2M0912+14) in the 2MASS catalogue was identified as having a common proper motion with the AB binary, and subsequent observations confirmed the brown dwarf nature of the companion. The new component, 81 Cancri C, was found to have a spectral type of L8, near to the L-T transition. Separated from the primary components by 43 arcseconds and at a distance of 20.4 parsecs, the brown dwarf has a minimum physical separation of approximately 880 AU.

The brown dwarf was found to be about half a magnitude brighter in the JHK bands than expected, compared to others of similar spectral type and known distance. The system was not found to not be particularly young to some confidence, so it was possible that component C could itself be a close binary not resolved by 2MASS. This was confirmed in 2006 as the source was found to be slightly oblong, caused by two components of similar spectral types. These two brown dwarfs, components C and D, have a separation of approximately 11 AU, and their mutual orbit likely takes on order of 150 years due to the small masses involved.

References

Cancer (constellation)
Spectroscopic binaries
G-type main-sequence stars
Cancri, Pi1
Cancri, 81
079096
3650
Gliese and GJ objects
045170
Durchmusterung objects